Cinéma du look was a French film movement of the 1980s and 1990s, analysed, for the first time, by French critic Raphaël Bassan in La Revue du Cinéma issue no. 449, May 1989, in which he classified Luc Besson, Jean-Jacques Beineix and Leos Carax as directors of the "look".

Style and origins
These directors were said to favor style over substance, spectacle over narrative. It referred to films that had a slick, gorgeous visual style and a focus on young, alienated characters who were said to represent the marginalized youth of François Mitterrand's France. Themes that run through many of their films include doomed love affairs, young people more affiliated to peer groups than families, a cynical view of the police, and the use of scenes in the Paris Métro to symbolise an alternative, underground society.  The mixture of 'high' culture, such as the opera music of Diva and Les Amants du Pont-Neuf, and pop culture, for example the references to Batman in Subway, was another key feature.

A parallel can be drawn between these French filmmakers' productions and New Hollywood films including most notably Francis Ford Coppola's One from the Heart (1981) and Rumble Fish (1983), Rainer Werner Fassbinder's Lola (1981), as well as television commercials, music videos and the series Miami Vice. The term was first defined by Raphael Bassan in La Revue De Cinema. He coined the term Cinéma du look as a pejorative, criticising the films for prioritising style over substance.

Key directors and key films

Jean-Jacques Beineix
Diva (1981) 
The Moon in the Gutter (1983 film) (1983)
37°2 le matin (English: Betty Blue) (1986)

Luc Besson
Subway (1985) 
Le Grand bleu (English: The Big Blue) (1988)
Nikita (1990)
Leon: The Professional (1994)

Leos Carax
Boy Meets Girl (1984) 
Mauvais Sang (1986) 
Les Amants du Pont-Neuf (1991)

See also
Vulgar auteurism
MTV
Neo-noir
Postmodern film and television
Auteur theory
Arthouse action film

References

Bibliography

External links
Patricia Allmer - Institute of Film Studies, University of Nottingham, 2004
Will da Shaman, Netribution Film Network
Guy Austin, Contemporary French Cinema: An Introduction, A Review by J. Emmett Winn, see Austin pages 5 and 6
Essays on Luc Besson : Master of Spectacle (review), by William Brown, 2009
The Cinéma du look and fantasy films, by Guy Austin in Contemporary French Cinema, Manchester University Press, 1996, p. 119
Diva, Jean-Jacques Beineix in The Cinema of France, by Phil Powrie, p. 154, Wallflower Press, 2006
Luc Besson : The Cinema du Look or the Spectacle-Image in Cinema after Deleuze by Richard Ruston, Bloomsbury Publishing, 2012, p. 132

Cinema of France
Movements in cinema
1980s in film
1990s in film